The North Macedonia men's national under-18 basketball team is a national basketball team of North Macedonia, administered by the Basketball Federation of North Macedonia. It represents the country in international men's under-18 basketball competitions.

FIBA U18 European Championship participations

See also
North Macedonia men's national basketball team
North Macedonia men's national under-16 basketball team
North Macedonia women's national under-18 basketball team

References

External links
 Official website 
 Archived records of North Macedonia team participations

U
National sports teams of North Macedonia
Men's national under-18 basketball teams